The 2019–20 season sees Olimpia Milano competing in both EuroLeague and Lega Basket Serie A. The first is the highest level of European basketball competitions, for which Milano has a license.

Overview 
Olimpia Milano's 2020–2021 season is sponsored by AX Armani Exchange and it's the 88th  consecutive season in the Serie A. It's also Ettore Messina's second year as the team's coach: in his first year Milano was struggling both in Euroleague and Serie A, but at the end due to the COVID-19 pandemic interruptions the team ended the season without any trophy.

The new season starts under the best auspices with the Eurosport Supercup victory and 8 games won out of 8.

Milano had a great start and by mid November they had a seven game winning streak in the Serie A and just two losses in Euroleague. But the season (especially in the Euroleague) could not proceed as per schedule due to postponed games caused by many players contracting SARS-CoV-2. Milano was forced to interrupt the team activities on 9 November when, after the game against Brescia, several players were tested positive.

Milano ends at the first place in the standing the first half of the season gaining the unofficial title of "winter champions" and they qualified to the Italian Basketball Cup. They dominated the competition and won the final against Pesaro.

In the EuroLeague Milano qualified to the playoffs ending the season in the fourth place which gave home advantage. A sensational win against Bayern Munich at the quarterfinals qualified Milano to the Final Four where they lost the semifinals at the last shot against Barcelona. The team will end the competition at the third place winning against CSKA Moscow third place game. The last qualification to a EuroLeague playoff series dates back to the 1991–92 edition.

The Serie A regular season ended with Milano in the first place of the standing, with 22 wins and 6 losses. At the playoffs Milano was the favourite for the title, but at the end things will not turn in the team's advantage: they reached the finals after winning against Dolomiti Energia Trento and Umana Reyer Venezia with a full 3-0 result. But in the final series the players showed signs of weariness from the long season and they lost all of the five matches of the finals against Virtus Segafredo Bologna that won the competition.

Timeline 
 3 August: Milano starts the summer preparation.
 27 August: the season officially starts with the 2020 Italian Basketball Supercup, Milano debuts with a win against Cantù.
 20 September: Milano wins the Supercup in the final played against Virtus Segafredo Bologna.
 27 September: starts the 2020–21 LBA season.
 2 October: starts the 2020–21 EuroLeague season.
 9 November: the team activities are suspended after several player were tested positive to SARS-CoV-2.
 15 November: the previous COVID tests showed many false positive and Milan, after further tests, resumed the team activities and played the derby against Cantù.
 10 January: Milano ends the first half of the season at the first place in the Serie A and gains the unofficial title of "Winter Champions".
 14 February: Milano wins the Italian Cup.
 31 March: Milano wins over Crvena zvezda and reaches mathematically the playoffs two matches before the end of the Euroleague regular season.
 5 May: Milano wins 5-3 the playoff series against Bayern Munich and reaches the Final Four after 14 years.
 11 May: Milano ends the regular season winning over Cremona at the first position.
 29 May: Milano loses against Barcelona the Final Four Semifinal. The win over CSKA Moscow will give Milano the 3rd place in the competition.
 12 June: Milano loses 4–0 the LBA Finals series against Virtus Bologna.

Kit 
Supplier: Armani / Sponsor: Armani Exchange

EuroLeague

Lega Basket Serie A

Cups

Team

Players

Depth chart 
 
Notes 
  EuroLeague only
  LBA only

Squad changes

In 

|}

Out 

|}

Confirmed 

|}

Coach

Youth team 
The following players have been called from the youth team and have made their appearance in the championship.

On loan

Staff and management

Pre-season and friendlies 
Torneo City of Cagliari

We're Back Preseason Tour

Competitions

Overview

Supercup

Group stage 
Table

Results summary

Results by round

Matches

Semifinal

Final 

Supercup Finals MVP
 Malcolm Delaney
Game rules
Game played under FIBA rules.

Frecciarossa Final Eight 2021 

The Frecciarossa Final Eight 2021 was the 53rd edition of the Italian Basketball Cup and Milano qualified by ending the first half of the season in the first place of the Italian Championship mid-season and gaining the unofficial title of "Winter Champions". The Cup was hosted in the Milan court at the Mediolanum Forum in Assago.

Matches 

Italian Cup Finals MVP
 Luigi Datome
Game rules
Game played under FIBA rules.

Serie A Regular Season

League table

Results summary

Results by round

Matches 

Notes
1   The match was voided after Virtus Roma withdrawal from the Serie A.
2   The match against Cremona was postponed because the team was stuck in Madrid, after the Euroleague match against Real, due to bad weather.
3   The last match was postoponed from May 2 to May 10: Happy Casa Brindisi had a number of players affected by COVID-19 and all the matches were postponed to ensure that all the games were played simultaneously.

Serie A Playoffs

Quarterfinals

Semifinals

Finals

EuroLeague Regular Season

League table

Results summary

Results by round

Matches 
Some matches could not be regularly played at the scheduled date due to positivity to SARS-CoV-2 tests from many Euroleague teams. Milano itself was one of the teams where numerous players were affected.

Notes
1.   Originally the match was scheduled to be played on 22 October 2020 but it was postponed to 11 November due to covid positives in the Zenit Saint Petersburg team. The game was subject to another deferement because Milano had other positive COVID cases that turned out to be false negative. The game was finally set to be played on 22 February 2021. 
2.   Originally the match was scheduled to be played on 30 October 2020, but it was postoponed to 1 December due to players found positive to COVID in the Alba Berlin Team. 
3.   Originally the match was scheduled to be played on 13 November 2020 but it was postponed to 8 December due to COVID positive tests in the Milano team.

EuroLeague Playoffs

Quarterfinals

Final Four

Statistics 
As of June 9, 2021.

Individual statistics Super Cup 

Notes
 Players that come from the youth team

Individual statistics Italian Cup

Individual statistics Serie A 

Notes
 Players that come from the youth team

Individual statistics Euroleague

Season individual statistics 

Notes
 Players that come from the youth team

Individual game highs 

Notes
  at least 5 attempts
  match ended in overtime

Team game highs 

Notes
  match ended in overtime

See also 

 2020–21 LBA season
 2020–21 EuroLeague
 2021 Italian Basketball Cup
 2020 Italian Basketball Supercup

References

External links
 

2020–21 EuroLeague by club
2020–21 in Italian basketball by club
Olimpia Milano seasons